Bình Ba is a commune (xã) and village in Châu Đức District, Bà Rịa–Vũng Tàu province, in Vietnam. It was the site of the Battle of Bình Ba in June 1969.

References

Populated places in Bà Rịa-Vũng Tàu province
Communes of Bà Rịa-Vũng Tàu province